Shit life syndrome (SLS) is a phrase used by physicians in the United Kingdom and the United States for the effect that a variety of poverty or abuse-induced disorders can have on patients.

Sarah O'Connor's 2018 article for the Financial Times "Left behind: can anyone save the towns the economy forgot?" on shit life syndrome in the English coastal town of Blackpool won the 2018 Orwell Prize for Exposing Britain's Social Evils. O'Connor wrote that

In a column for The Irish Times, writer John McManus questioned whether Ireland had developed shit life syndrome in the wake of a recent fall in life expectancy.

A 2018 article in The Quietus on the films of the British director Mike Leigh identified shit life syndrome in Leigh's 2002 film All or Nothing. Kinney wrote that "The film asks questions about poverty – what does poverty do to people? How do you react when the chips are down? ... The rise of populism in this country has been analysed through the lens of the 'left behind' – in a less crude way, this is exactly what All or Nothing was observing sixteen years ago."

Rosemary Rizq, in an essay in the 2016 collection The Future of Psychological Therapy, questioned the origin of the term shit life syndrome, writing that "The phrase seemed to denote a level of long-standing poverty, family breakdown, lack of stability, unemployment and potential risk factors common to many of the predominately young, working class patients referred to the [psychotherapeutic] service" for shit is "something that we continually reject, get rid of or hide. At the same time it is something we cannot completely repudiate, it is part of us, something we need" and that the individuals with SLS have problems so "terrible, so untouchable" that they "quite literally cannot be thought about, cannot be handled by the service", yet a therapeutic organisation is "obliged to do so".

See also 
 Diseases of poverty
 Disability and poverty

References 

Medical terminology